David Barnes (born 22 February 1986) is an athlete from Adelaide, Australia.  He competes in archery. He was an Australian Institute of Sport scholarship holder.

Barnes competed at the 2004 Summer Olympics in men's individual archery.  He was defeated in the first round of elimination, placing 36th overall.  Barnes was also a member of the 6th-place Australian men's archery team at the 2004 Summer Olympics.

Barnes was part of Australia's men's archery team that qualified for the 2020 Tokyo Olympic Games. His team-mates were Ryan Tyack and Taylor Worth. They competed together in the team event as well against one another in the individual event. In the individual event Barnes fell to Indonesia's Riau Ega Agatha in the first round, In the team event, they lost to the favoured Taiwanese team in the first round.

Early years 
Barnes began archery as a nine-year-old. He loved target practice and ended up getting a fibreglass bow. His parents then encouraged him to join a club. In 1999 at the age of 13 he was invited to represent Australia at the 2000 Sydney Olympic Test Event

In 2003 Barnes competed at the Australian Youth Olympic Festival and won two gold medals. At the World Championships he achieved an individual silver and an overall Australian team win. In 2004 Barnes made his Olympic debut as an 18-year-old when he competed at the 2004 Athens Olympic Games.

Achievements 
Some of his best achievements are:
 3rd, Senior World Championships in 2003, New York 
 2nd, Cadet World Championships in 2002, Czech Republic
 1st, Cadet Teams World Championships in 2002, Czech Republic
 2nd, European Grand Prix, 2002, Turkey
 3rd, International Athens tournament, 2003, Athens
 3rd, European Grand Prix, 2004, Croatia
 3rd, European Grand Prix, 2004, Turkey
 1st, IFAA World Field Archery Championships 2006, Australia

Barnes has set many world records along the way including
 2000 Set 3 Cadet World Records
 2001 Set 2 Cadet World Records
 2002 Set 2 Junior, 18 Cadet, and 3 Cadet Team World Records
 2003 Set 1 Junior world Record
 2004 Set 1 Junior World Record

References

1986 births
Living people
Archers at the 2004 Summer Olympics
Australian male archers
Olympic archers of Australia
Australian Institute of Sport archers
Archers at the 2020 Summer Olympics
20th-century Australian people
21st-century Australian people